The 1980 Amateur World Series was the 26th Amateur World Series (AWS), an international men's amateur baseball tournament. The tournament was sanctioned by the International Baseball Federation (which titled it the Baseball World Cup as of the 1988 tournament). The tournament took place in Japan, the first time outside the Americas or Europe, from August 22 to September 5, and was won by Cubaits 16th AWS victory.

There were 12 participating countries.

Standings

References
Men: World Cup at Sports123.com

Amateur World Series
1980
Amateur World Series 
Amateur World Series 
Amateur World Series